The women's javelin throw event at the 2000 Asian Athletics Championships was held in Jakarta, Indonesia on 30 August. It was the first edition of the championships after the introduction of the new model of javelin thus the winning result was automatically the new championships record.

Results

References

2000 Asian Athletics Championships
Javelin throw at the Asian Athletics Championships
2000 in women's athletics